Lone Jack School C-6 District is headquartered in Lone Jack, Missouri, United States.

Schools
 Lone Jack Elementary
 Lone Jack Middle School
 Lone Jack High School

References

School districts in Missouri